Cipriano "Dodoy" M. Cermeño II (December 5, 1955 – July 25, 2010), better known by his screen name Redford White, was a Filipino actor and comedian. He was best known on his role as Sol in the television sitcom Buddy and Sol opposite Eric Quizon playing Buddy. White was recognized as Best Comedy Actor on the 5th PMPC Star Awards for Television for his role as Sol.

Early life and career
White first came to prominence in the late 1970s for his supporting role in the sitcom Iskul Bukol. He had a string of hits as the leading man in several 1980s comedies such as Boni and Klayd, Darakula and Hee Man: Master of None, his first major role. For several years, he starred in the TV sitcom Buddy en Sol with Eric Quizon.

In the latter part of his career, White appeared in several films for Star Cinema such as Tar-San, Ala eh... Con Bisoy! Hale-hale-hoy!: Laging panalo ang Mga Unggoy, and Haba-baba-doo! Puti-puti-poo! paired with various comedians including Babalu, Bonel Balingit, Carding Castro and Leo Martinez. His last film and television appearances were in Iskul Bukol 20 Years After and Palos on ABS-CBN, respectively, in 2008.

Personal life
White was reportedly born with albinism, which gave rise to the surname of his screen name. On the other hand, the first name of his screen name is based on the name of American actor Robert Redford.

He was married to Elena Cermeño and they had a daughter, Jeruie. His closest friends were his fellow Buddy En Sol co-star Eric Quizon, Vic Sotto who worked with him in the sitcom Daddy Di Do Du, singer-songwriter Jim Paredes and comedians Gabe Mercado and Leo Martinez.

Illness and death
White died at the age of 54 from lung cancer and a brain tumor on July 25, 2010, at 06:47 PST (GMT+8). He had reportedly experienced dizziness and difficulty walking, and loss of balance as early as July 2008, which the actor initially mistook for symptoms of vertigo. His physician advised magnetic resonance imaging, which White refused. He was later diagnosed with stage 4 brain cancer in February 2010.

His wake took place at Santo Niño de Maligaya Shrine in Maligaya Park Subdivision, Novaliches, Quezon City, Metro Manila.

Filmography

Film
Iskul Bukol (Freshmen) (1980)
A Man Called 'Tolongges''' (1981) as Arizona GidBoni & Klayd (1981) as BoniSinisinta Kita, Di Ka Kumikibo (1981)Tartan (1981)Darakula (1982) as DarakulaJohnny Tanggo Rides Again... Tatanga-tanga, Dakila Naman (1983) as Johnny TanggoRambo Tan-go (1984) as Johnny Rambo TangoWrong Rangers (1984)Billy the Kid and the Sunshine Gid (1984)Sekreta "Ini" (1984)Okey sa Olrayt (1984)S.W.A.K.: Samahang Walang Atrasan sa Kalaban (1985)I Won, I Won (Ang Swerte Nga Naman) (1985) - GundingHee-Man: Master of None (1985) - Hee-ManSoldyer! (1986)Tu-Yay and His Magic Payong (1986) - Emilio/TuyayPipo's Power (1986) - PipoNinja Komisyon (1986) - JackyNo Return No Exchange (1986)Cobrador (1986)Rocky Tan-go IV (1986) as RockyLost and Found Command: Rebels Without Because (1987) - Cpl. AkomplisBalandra Crossing (1987)Rangers in the Wrong War (1987)Pulis Iskwad (1987)The Untouchable Family (1988) - Machine Gun NonongParrot Unit (1988) as Cpl. Akomplis7 Pasiklab sa Army (1988)Ompong Galapong: May Ulo, Walang Tapon (1988) - RobertKumander Anting-Anting (1988)Code Name: Black & White (1988) - WhiteyCaptain Yagit (1989) as Dodoy/Captain YagitBuddy en Sol (Sine Ito) (1992) - SolSi Lucio at si Miguel: Hihintayin Kayo sa Langit (1992) - LucioMukhang Bungo: Da Coconut Nut (1992) - Boboy MortegaTeacher...Teacher I Love You (also known as Titser... Titser... I Love You, 1993)Buddy en Sol: Praybeyt Depektibs (1993) - SolNeber 2-Geder (1996)Pablik Enemi 1 N 2 (Aksidental Heroes) (1997) - LuisWanted Perfect Murder (1997) - ElvisI Do? I Die! (D'yos Ko Day!) (1997) - MokongHaba-Baba-Doo! Puti-Puti-Poo! (1998) - MokongTong Tatlong Tatay Kong Pakitong Kitong (1998) - AlvinAla Eh con Bisoy, Hale Hale Hoy! (Laging Panalo ang Mga Unggoy) (1998) - ClintonTik Tak Toys: My Kolokotoys (1999) - PresleyIsprikitik: Walastik Kung Pumitik (1999) - BrandoTar-San (1999) - TarBestman ...4 Better Not 4 Worse (2002) - Carlos MiguelIspiritista: Itay, May Moomoo (2005) - Mang TeroyIskul Bukol 20 Years After: The Ungasis and Escaleras Adventure (2008) - Redford

TelevisionIskul Bukol (IBC, 1978–1981) as Redford (1978-1980)Champoy (RPN 9, 1980–1985) as guestT.O.D.A.S.: Television's Outrageously Delightful All-Star Show (IBC, 1980–1984) as himself (1980)Bisoy (BBC 2, 1980–1981)2+2 (BBC 2, 1982–1986)Lovingly Yours (GMA Network, 1984–1996) as guestUFO: Urbano, Feliciano & Others (GMA Network, 1985–1986) as guestFamily 3 Plus 1 (GMA Network, 1986–1988) as guestPalibhasa Lalake (ABS-CBN, 1987–1998) as guestAng Tabi Kong Mamaw (IBC, 1988–1989) as guestBuddy en Sol (RPN, 1990–1994) as SolHaybol Rambol (GMA Network, 1994–1995)Mikee (GMA Network, 1994)Mikee Forever (GMA Network, 1995) as guestBubble Gang (GMA Network, 1995–2009) as guestMaalaala Mo Kaya (ABS-CBN, 1995–2005) as guestHome Along Da Riles (ABS-CBN, 1995) as guestSuper Laff-In (ABS-CBN, 1996–1999) as himselfMikee Forever (GMA Network, 1996)Pwedeng Pwede (ABS-CBN, 1999–2001) as BruceDaddy Di Do Du (GMA Network, 2001–2007) as BruceMagpakailanman (GMA Network, 2002–2003)Home Along Da Airport (ABS-CBN, 2003–2005) as GabrielQuizon Avenue (ABS-CBN, 2005)O Ha! (ABC "now TV5", 2006)Kokey (ABS-CBN, 2007) as Nanding KalugdanPalos (ABS-CBN, 2008) as Mario (his last TV show)Tunay na Buhay (GMA Network, 2013) posthumously featuredSabado Badoo (GMA Network, 2015) posthumously featured

Awards
Winner, Best Comedy Actor for Buddy En Sol - 5th PMPC Star Awards for Television
Nominated, Best Comedy Actor for Kokey'' - 22nd PMPC Star Awards for Television

References

External links

1955 births
2010 deaths
Cebuano comedians
Cebuano television actors
Deaths from lung cancer in the Philippines
Deaths from brain cancer in the Philippines
Filipino male comedians
Filipino Roman Catholics
Filipino television personalities
Male actors from Cebu
People from Cebu City
People with albinism
Visayan people
GMA Network personalities
ABS-CBN personalities